Wollongbar was a 2,005-ton passenger steamship built by the Ailsa Shipbuilding Company, Troon in 1911 for the North Coast Steam Navigation Company.

Fate
Her wreck was broken up in situ.

Notes

1911 ships
Ships built on the River Clyde
Shipwrecks of the Richmond-Tweed Region
Maritime incidents in 1921
Merchant ships of Australia
Iron and steel steamships of Australia
1901 – World War I ships of Australia
Interwar period ships of Australia
1921 in Australia